This is a list of NIT bids by school (divided by their current conference affiliation).  As of the 2014 tournament, 269 schools have made appearances in the tournament.  The 12 schools whose names are listed in the last table are no longer in NCAA Division I Men's Basketball, and can no longer be included in the tournament.  The years listed are the last tournament year a school has reached a certain round of the NIT.

Some schools have NIT tournament appearances under previous names. For example, UTEP was known as Texas Western when it won its NCAA title in 1966.

Bids by conference

America East Conference

American Athletic Conference

ASUN Conference

Atlantic 10 Conference

Atlantic Coast Conference

Big 12 Conference

Big East Conference

Big Sky Conference

Big South Conference

Big Ten Conference

Big West Conference

Colonial Athletic Association

Conference USA

Horizon League

Ivy League

Metro Atlantic Athletic Conference

Mid-American Conference

Mid-Eastern Athletic Conference

Missouri Valley Conference

Mountain West Conference

Northeast Conference

Ohio Valley Conference

Pac-12 Conference

Patriot League

Southeastern Conference

Southern Conference

Southland Conference

Southwestern Athletic Conference

Summit League

Sun Belt Conference

West Coast Conference

Western Athletic Conference

Currently Non-Division I

Notes

See also
NIT all-time team records
NIT championships and semifinal appearances
NCAA Division I men's basketball tournament bids by school
CBI bids by school
CIT bids by school
NCIT bids by school

College men's basketball records and statistics in the United States